Stapledon may refer to:

 George Stapledon, Grassland scientist and Environmentalist
 Olaf Stapledon, British philosopher and author of several works of science fiction.
 Walter de Stapledon, English bishop
 Stapledon, Ontario, Canada, a small rural village west of Richmond